In molecular biology, snoRNA SNORD90 (HBII-295) is a non-coding RNA that belongs to the family of C/D snoRNAs. Initially described as HBII-295 this RNA has now been called SNORD70 by the HUGO Gene Nomenclature Committee. It is the human orthologue of the mouse MBII-295 and has no identified RNA target. This RNA is expressed from an intron of the MNAB/OR1K1 gene.

References

External links 
 
 
 HGNC database entry

Small nuclear RNA